David Julian Levi (born November 13, 1994) is an American actor and keyboard player. He is best known for the role as himself on The Naked Brothers Band. Both in the show and in real life, David Levi has known Nat Wolff and his family since they were in preschool.

Filmography
The Naked Brothers Band: The Movie (2007)
The Naked Brothers Band (TV series) (2007–2009)
The Naked Brothers Band: Battle of the Bands (2007)
The Naked Brothers Band: Sidekicks (2008)
The Naked Brothers Band: Polar Bears (2008)
The Naked Brothers Band: Mystery Girl (2008)
The Naked Brothers Band: Operation Mojo (2008)
The Naked Brothers Band: Naked Idol (2009)
The Naked Brothers Band: The Premiere (2009)
L-E-V: Leviticus (2010)

References

External links
 

1994 births
Living people
21st-century American male actors
American male child actors
American male television actors
American rock musicians
The Naked Brothers Band members